The Pays de Retz is a historical subregion of France that currently forms part of the Loire-Atlantique department, but which previously formed part of the Duchy of Brittany.

The area lies between the southern shore of the Loire estuary and the Marais breton (Breton marshlands), bordered to the west by the Baie de Bourgneuf (Bourgneuf Bay) and on the east by the Lac de Grand-Lieu (Grand-Lieu Lake) and a network of small rivers. Its main towns are Rezé (which was its capital and the see of a Catholic Diocese of Rezé from 510 to 851), Pornic, Paimbœuf and Machecoul (another historical capital city).

History 
In the early 9th century the area formed part of Frankish territory, but was coveted by the Breton ruler Nominoe. Nominoe and his son Erispoe won a series of victories over the Franks between 843 and 851, resulting in the Treaty of Angers (851) between Charles the Bald and Erispoe, which gave "Ratense" or Pays de Retz to Brittany.

In subsequent centuries there was conflict between Brittany and Anjou over the area. The notorious medieval serial killer Baron Gilles de Rais was from the area, and murdered and raped a large number of local peasant children.

During the War in the Vendée of 1793, the area was a Royalist stronghold.

References

Literature 
 Dominique Biron, Elizabeth Brisson, Dominique et Joseph Péroys, "Contes de la Voisine. Seize contes populaires en parler du Pays de Retz", Séquences, 1990
 Le Patrimoine des communes de la Loire-Atlantique, éditions Flohic, 2001
 Gilles Perraudeau, "Contes populaires du Pays de Retz", éd. du Pays de Retz, 1982

Geography of Brittany
History of Brittany